Denio is a census-designated place (CDP) in Humboldt County, Nevada, along the Oregon state line in the United States. The Denio post office was originally north of the state line in Harney County, Oregon, but the residents moved the building into Nevada in the mid-20th century. The population of the CDP, which is entirely in Nevada, was 47 at the 2010 census; additional development considered to be Denio extends into Oregon. The CDP includes a post office, a community center, a library, and the Diamond Inn Bar, the center of the town's social life. Recreational activities in the Denio area include bird watching, photography, off road vehicle use, fishing, recreational black opal mining, rockhounding, hunting, visiting the hot springs, and camping on the Sheldon National Wildlife Refuge.

Denio Junction's motel provides gas, food, groceries, and lodging. Denio Junction Airport is a two-runway graded airstrip. There is no scheduled air or ground transportation serving this field, which is a short walk from Denio Junction.

History

Denio was named after Aaron Denio, who settled in the area in 1885. He was born in 1824 in Illinois and traveled to California in 1860. He worked in milling, mining, and farming in Nevada and California for 25 years before settling near the Oregon-Nevada border. He died at Denio in 1907. The Denio post office was established in Oregon in 1888. After World War II a number of businesses relocated south of the state line to take advantage of Nevada's lack of an income tax and more liberal liquor, gambling, and prostitution laws. The post office was moved and reopened in Nevada in 1950 for Nevada addresses, not Oregon.

Education
Public education in Denio (on the Nevada side) is administered by the Humboldt County School District, which operates the Denio School, a three room kindergarten-eighth grade (K-8) school. It is a two-room schoolhouse. The school lacks a full service cafeteria. Its nature, as of 2004, allows teachers to have informal, flexible scheduling. It had 20 students in the 1963-1964 school year. The enrollment in December 2004 was the same number as the 1963-1964 figure.

 Denio, Nevada students of high school age may attend Humboldt County School District's Albert M. Lowry High School in Winnemucca, Nevada; parents with high school aged children may, while their children are high school aged, move to Winnemucca for the duration of the students' stays. Students may also attend Crane Union High School, a public boarding high school in Crane, Oregon. The Oregon side across from Denio, Nevada is, in 2020, zoned to South Harney School District 33 (Fields School, K-8) and Harney County Union High School District 1J (the district for Crane Union). The Denio, Oregon community was historically served by Crane Union, with the high school taking in several Basque Oregonians from there.

Denio has a public library, a branch of the Humboldt County Library.

Harney County is not in a community college district but has a "contract out of district" (COD) with Treasure Valley Community College. TVCC operates the Burns Outreach Center in Burns.

Climate

Demographics

See also

 List of census-designated places in Nevada
 Hatfield, California–Oregon
 McDermitt, Nevada and Oregon

References

Further reading

 - Clipping from Newspapers.com. Text Detail A. Right caption details.

External links

 
 Images of Denio from Panoramio
 Images of Denio from Flickr
 Humboldt County School District Rural Remote Schools - Includes information on the Denio School

Census-designated places in Humboldt County, Nevada
Census-designated places in Nevada
Unincorporated communities in Harney County, Oregon
1888 establishments in Oregon
Unincorporated communities in Oregon
1888 establishments in Nevada
Populated places established in 1888